Yogi and the Invasion of the Space Bears is a 1988 animated made-for-television film produced by Hanna-Barbera for syndication as part of the Hanna-Barbera Superstars 10 series. This Hanna-Barbera production was the last to feature Daws Butler as the voice of Yogi Bear. Yogi and Boo-Boo go on an out-of-this-world voyage. When they are kidnapped by spacemen, the duo are cloned, and the clone bears soon invade Jellystone Park.

Synopsis
Ranger Smith, fed up with Yogi constantly stealing campers' picnic baskets, declares it to be "Y. B. Day", and plans to send Yogi Bear to Siberia. While in hiding, Yogi and Boo-Boo are abducted by two aliens, Zor 1 and Zor 2, and taken to Planet Daxson. The next day Ranger Smith and his sidekick Ranger Roubideux try to find Yogi but find Cindy instead, who is angry and refuses to talk. Meanwhile, Zor 1 and Zor 2 introduce Yogi and Boo-Boo to their boss, DAX Nova. DAX Nova creates clones of Yogi and Boo-Boo and sends them to take over Jellystone Park.

Cindy meets with Smith and Roubideux, and tells them she's worried about Yogi and Boo-Boo, but Smith, who thinks she might be "covering up" for them, tells her there is no sign of them. He then spots the clones and locks them up. He then notices another three clone pairs, and in a panic locks himself up before calling for help. Back in space the real Yogi and Boo-Boo need help to get home. Boo-Boo meets his love interest Snulu and asks for her help in returning home. DAX Nova attempts to catch them, but ends up capturing a pair of bear robots.

Back at Jellystone, Roubideux takes Cindy to see Smith, who tells her about the three Yogi Bears and three Boo-Boos and jokes that he was having a nightmare. Cindy visits Mountain Bear and asks where Yogi and Boo Boo are gone. Upset, she starts crying, saying she misses Yogi. The next day she spots the Bear Robots and thinks she's having a nightmare, but she hears the voices of the real Yogi and Boo-Boo. Yogi tells her all about the Bear Robots, and tells her that they're called Dupiods. He tells her that he and Boo-Boo trapped Zor 1, Zor 2 and DAX Nova in space and saved the park. That night they find Boo-Boo singing to his girlfriend Snulu, whom he had to leave behind. Yogi tells Cindy that Boo-Boo can sing now, and Cindy is so happy that she gives him a big bear hug.

The next day Ranger Smith gets into trouble with the commissioner, but Yogi and his friends clean up the robots. Ranger Smith then thanks Yogi for saving the park.

Voice cast
 Daws Butler (in his final role) as Yogi Bear 
 Don Messick as Boo Boo Bear and Ranger Smith
 Julie Bennett as Cindy Bear
 Linda Harmon as Cindy Bear (singing)
 Susan Blu as Snulu
 Sorrell Booke as Mountain Bear
 Victoria Carroll as Additional Voices
 Townsend Coleman as Zor 1
 Peter Cullen as Ranger Roubideux
 Rob Paulsen as Zor 2
 Maggie Roswell as Little Girl
 Michael Rye as Ranger Jones
 Frank Welker as DAX Nova
 Patric Zimmerman as Ranger Brown

Trivia
It was the last film of the Hanna-Barbera Superstars 10 series to use digital ink and paint.
Daws Butler's final project.

Home media
The movie was released on VHS by Worldvision Home Video in 1992.

On December 7, 2010, Warner Archive released the movie on DVD in NTSC picture format with all region encoding, via their collection. This is a Manufacture-on-Demand (MOD) release, available exclusively through Warner's online store and Amazon.com.

References

External links
 
 

1988 television films
1988 animated films
1988 films
1980s American animated films
Films based on television series
Animated films based on animated series
Animated films about extraterrestrial life
Yogi Bear films
First-run syndicated television programs in the United States
Hanna-Barbera animated films
Hanna–Barbera Superstars 10
American children's animated comedy films
American science fiction comedy films
Films directed by Ray Patterson (animator)
Alien abduction films
Films about cloning
1980s children's animated films